Filial may refer to:

 Filial church, a Roman Catholic church to which is annexed the cure of souls, but which remains dependent on another church
 Filial piety, one of the virtues in Confucian thought
 Filial hybrids, used in genetics (written as F1, F2, etc.)

See also

 Filiation